WMN may refer to:

Maroantsetra Airport, Madagascar, IATA airport code
Warminster railway station, Wiltshire, National Rail station code
West Monkseaton Metro station, North Tyneside, Tyne and Wear Metro station code
Wireless mesh network, a communications network made up of radio nodes organized in a mesh topology